John Gosselyn (fl. 1384–1386) was a Member of Parliament for Weymouth, Dorset, England in November 1384 and 1386.

References

14th-century births
Year of death missing
14th-century English people
People from Weymouth, Dorset
Year of birth missing
English MPs November 1384
English MPs 1386